Alperen Şengün (born 25 July 2002) is a Turkish professional basketball player for the Houston Rockets of the National Basketball Association (NBA). He also represents the senior Turkish national team. He is widely considered to be one of the best Turkish-born prospects in the league, having won the Turkish League MVP award in 2021. Şengün was selected with the 16th pick in the first round of the 2021 NBA Draft, the second highest selection of a Turkish player after Enes Kanter was selected third overall in 2011.

Early life and youth career
Alperen Şengün was born in Giresun, northeastern Turkey, on 25 July 2002. His parents wanted him to be a swimmer, instead he preferred basketball, as he was inspired by seeing his older brother play the sport before. He started playing basketball at the age of eight. Early on, he competed in both sports simultaneously. However, due to practical issues, like a lack of necessary time that was needed to properly train for both sports, he had to choose between the two and finally decided to continue with basketball.

Giresun University  (2012–2014)
In 2012, Şengün began playing youth system basketball with the youth teams of the sports club of Giresun University, where he played until 2014.

Banvit (2014–2019)
After his discovery by head coach Ahmet Gürgen, during a youth sports festival, Şengün moved from Giresun to Bandırma, to join the youth teams of the Turkish club Bandırma, which was then known as Banvit. By August 2014, he had signed a youth contract with Banvit. In the 2018–19 season, while competing with Banvit's juniors, Şengün eventually won the Turkish Basketball Junior League championship (which was established in 2017). Şengün was also named the Turkish Junior League's MVP.

Professional career

Bandırma Kırmızı (2018–2019)
Şengün began his professional club career in the 2018–19 TBL season with Bandırma Kırmızı, of the second division Turkish First League (TBL). In 29 games played in Turkey's 2nd division, he averaged 10.8 points, 6.8 rebounds, 1.2 assists, 0.8 steals, and 0.7 blocks per game in 21.9 minutes per game. He shot 47.6 percent from the field overall, 53.6 percent on 2-point field goal attempts, 25.9 percent on 3-point field goal attempts, and 60.0 percent from the free-throw line.

Teksüt Bandırma (2019–2020)
Şengün joined the first division Turkish Super League (BSL) club Teksüt Bandırma, for the 2019–20 BSL season. In 22 games played in Turkey's 1st division, he averaged 5.0 points, 3.9 rebounds, 0.6 assists, 0.5 steals, and 0.4 blocks per game in 13.5 minutes per game. He shot 51.1 percent from the field overall, 57.5 percent on 2-point field goal attempts, 0–10 (0.00 percent) on 3-point field goal attempts, and 58.6 percent from the free-throw line.

He also played in one of Europe's two secondary level competitions, the FIBA Champions League. During the 2019–20 BCL season, he averaged 6.6 points, 3.3 rebounds, 0.6 assists, 0.3 steals, and 0.7 blocks per game in 14.9 minutes per game across 15 games played. He shot 48.0 percent from the field overall, 53.6 percent on 2-point field goal attempts, 31.6 percent 3-point field goal attempts, and 63.6 percent from the free-throw line.

Beşiktaş (2020–2021)
In August 2020, Şengün signed a three-year contract with the Turkish club Beşiktaş. He had an excellent regular season with Beşiktaş, as he averaged 19.2 points, 9.4 rebounds, 2.5 assists, 1.3 steals, and 1.7 blocks in 28.3 minutes per game across 29 games played in the Basketball Super League. On 12 May 2021, he was named the MVP of the BSL's regular season. On the same day, he announced his decision to enter 2021 NBA draft.

Overall, in Turkey's 2020–21 BSL season (regular season and playoffs), in 28.1 minutes per game, he averaged 18.6 points, 8.9 rebounds, 2.7 assists, 1.3 steals, and 1.5 blocks in 34 games played. He shot 62.6 percent from the field overall, 66.7 percent on 2-point field goal attempts, 21.2 percent on 3-point field goal attempts, and 81.2 percent from the free-throw line. He also played with Beşiktaş in the fourth-level European-wide competition, the FIBA Europe Cup. In the Europe Cup's 2020–21 season, in 29.7 minutes per game, he averaged 23.0 points, 7.3 rebounds, 2.7 assists, 1.7 steals, and two blocks in three games played. He shot 71.0 percent from the field overall, 75.9 percent on 2-point field goal attempts, 0–2 (0.00 percent) on 3-point field goal attempts, and 69.4 percent from the free-throw line.

Houston Rockets (2021–present)

2021–22 season 
On the night of the 2021 NBA draft, Şengün was originally projected to be a potential lottery draft pick but was instead drafted outside the lottery and was selected with the 16th overall pick by the Oklahoma City Thunder. He was later traded to the Houston Rockets for two future first-round picks. On August 7, 2021, he signed a contract with the Rockets. On 8 August, he made his summer league debut in an 84–76 win against the Cleveland Cavaliers where he posted 15 points, 15 rebounds, four blocks, three assists, and one steal in 27 minutes. He made his preseason debut off the bench on October 5, in a 125–119 win against the Washington Wizards with five points, eight rebounds, three assists, and one block and steal. On  October 20, Şengün made his NBA debut, putting up 11 points, six rebounds, two assists, and three steals in a 124–106 loss to the Minnesota Timberwolves. 

On March 9, 2022, Şengün scored 21 points and gobbled 14 rebounds in a 130–139 overtime win against the Los Angeles Lakers.  On March 26, Şengün put up a then-career high 27 points along with seven rebounds in a 115–98 win over the Portland Trail Blazers. After his season as a rookie was over, Şengün had played 72 games while missing the last 10 games from an injury and started 13 games in the lineup. He averaged 9.6 points, 5.5 rebounds, 2.6 assists, and 0.9 blocks per game on 47.4 percent shooting from the field and 24.8 percent from deep onwards in his rookie season.

2022–23 season 
In the offseason, the Rockets chose Bruno Fernando over Şengün to become the starting center position after trading away forward Christian Wood to the Dallas Mavericks. During the early start of the season, the team promoted Şengün to become a full-time starter after Fernando suffered an injury. On November 26, 2022, Şengün scored 21 points and seven assists along with a career-high 19 rebounds in a 118–105 win against the Oklahoma City Thunder. On December 6, he posted eight points and rebounds along with an assist in a 132–123 win against the Philadelphia 76ers, becoming the youngest center at 20 years and 133 days of age to post 1000 points and 200 assists and surpasses Brad Daugherty record at age 21 and 153 days old along with Alvan Adams, Bam Adebayo and Nikola Jokic.

On January 11, 2023, Şengün put up his first career triple-double with 10 points, 10 rebounds, and 10 assists in a 135–115 loss to the Sacramento Kings. He also became the youngest player in Rockets history to record a triple-double in a game. On January 16, he put up a career-high 33 points along with 15 rebounds, six assists, and four blocks in a 140–132 loss to the Los Angeles Lakers. He also became the youngest player in Rockets history to record at least 30 points and 10 rebounds in a game, breaking Hakeem Olajuwon's record in 1984. He subsequently became the youngest center in NBA history to record at least 30 points, 15 rebounds and five assists in a game, surpassing Shaquille O'Neal’s record in 1993. On January 25, he recorded his second career triple-double with 21 points, 11 rebounds, and 10 assists in a 108–103 loss to the Washington Wizards. He also became the youngest center in NBA history to record multiple triple-doubles before turning 21 years old.

National team career

Junior national team
Şengün competed with the Turkish junior under-16 national team at the 2018 FIBA Under-16 European Championship, which was held in Novi Sad, Serbia, where he finished the competition by winning the bronze medal. Şengün was also selected to the competition's All-Tournament Team. In seven games played during the tournament, he averaged 14.4 points, 9.4 rebounds, 2.0 assists, 1.6 steals, and 1.4 blocks per game in 24.9 minutes per game. He shot 56.9 percent from the field overall, 61.9 percent on 2-point field goal attempts, 22.2 percent on 3-point field goal attempts, and 48.6 percent from the free-throw line.

He was also a part of the Turkish junior under-17 national team that competed at the 2018 FIBA Under-17 World Cup, which was held in Argentina. Turkey finished that tournament in fifth place. In seven games played at that tournament, he averaged 15.9 points, 12.3 rebounds, 2.0 assists, 0.7 steals, and 0.9 blocks per game, in 28.6 minutes per game. He shot 58.3 percent from the field overall, 64.1 percent on 2-point field goal attempts, 12.5 percent on 3-point field goal attempts, and 56.5 percent from the free-throw line.

Şengün also played at the 2019 FIBA Under-18 European Championship, with the Turkish junior under-18 national team, which won the tournament's silver medal. He was also selected to that competition's All-Tournament Team, being the only Turkish player that was chosen for that honor. In seven games played at that tournament, he averaged 11.9 points, 9.0 rebounds, 2.0 assists, 1.6 steals, and 1.7 blocks per game, in 23.0 minutes per game. He shot 54.5 percent from the field overall, 59.2 percent on 2-point field goal attempts, 16.7 percent on 3-point field goal attempts, and 59.5 percent from the free-throw line.

Senior national team
In November 2020, Şengün joined the senior Turkish national team, as he played with Turkey at the 2022 EuroBasket Qualifiers. In four games played at the qualifiers, he averaged 12.0 points, 7.3 rebounds, 1.0 assists, 1.3 steals, and 1.0 blocks, in 23.1 minutes per game. He shot 53.3 percent from the field overall, 51.9 percent on 2-point field goal attempts, 66.7 percent on 3-point field goal attempts, and 50.0 percent from the free-throw line.

In September 2022, Şengün played at EuroBasket 2022. He was the best player on the team, leading the team in points (16.8 per game) and rebounds (8.2 per game). Şengün and Turkey were eliminated in the round of 16 after losing to France in overtime.

Player profile 
Standing at 6 feet and 11 inches (2.11 meters) and 243 pounds (110 kilograms) with a 7 feet wingspan, Şengün plays at the power forward and center position. NBA commentators and scouts considered him one of the most "skilled" and "productive" big men entering the 2021 NBA draft following his "dominant" season in the Turkish League. With a solid frame and wide base, he is known for a versatile and highly-efficient low-post game that utilizes drop steps, spin moves, and fadeaways. Şengün is additionally equipped with an impressive and elite passing ability that is supplemented by what scouts view as an advanced feel for the court—i.e., his ability to space the court, set screens, cut to the rim, and make plays within the flow of the offense. As a defender, he is most effective on on-ball matchups in isolation against other big men, though his defense in general has been called into question.

His skillset has been compared to other European big men such as Nikola Jokić, Domantas Sabonis, and Nikola Vučević, and other players such as Kevin Love, Bobby Portis, and Tom Gugliotta.

His free-throw routine where he speaks to the basketball has also garnered attention by NBA commentators.

Career statistics

NBA

Regular season

|-
| style="text-align:left;"|
| style="text-align:left;"| Houston
| 72 || 13 || 20.7 || .474 || .248 || .711 || 5.5 || 2.6 || .8 || .9 || 9.6

Youth club competitions

European domestic club competitions

Pan European club competitions

References

External links
Alperen Şengün at nba.com
Alperen Şengün at championsleague.basketball

Alperen Şengün at proballers.com
Alperen Şengün at realgm.com
Alperen Şengün at tblstat.net

2002 births
Living people
Bandırma B.İ.K. players
Bandırma Kırmızı B.K. players
Beşiktaş men's basketball players
Centers (basketball)
Houston Rockets players
National Basketball Association players from Turkey
Oklahoma City Thunder draft picks
Power forwards (basketball)
Sportspeople from Giresun
Turkish expatriate basketball people in the United States
Turkish men's basketball players